Interpass Ridge is located on the border of Alberta and British Columbia. It was named in 1924 by the Interprovincial Boundary Survey. It connects Avalanche Pass and Beaverdam Pass.

See also
 List of peaks on the Alberta–British Columbia border
 Mountains of Alberta
 Mountains of British Columbia

References

Interpass Ridge
Interpass Ridge
Canadian Rockies